Onni Alfred Hiltunen (26 November 1895 – 8 June 1971) was a Finnish politician, minister in several cabinets and chairman of the Social Democratic Party.

Hiltunen was born in Jyväskylä.  He worked as railwayman and was later a shopkeeper. He worked at a social democratic paper in Varkaus 1931–1946. Hiltunen was elected to the parliament for terms between 1930 and 1962 first from Northern and later from Southern Savonia electoral district.

Hiltunen was chairman of the Social Democratic Party between 1944 and 1946. He hold several ministerial posts, including Minister of Finance 1944, 1948–1950, 1951, Minister of Trade and Industry and Deputy Prime Minister 1958–1959, Minister of Finance 1945–1946, 1946–1948.

He was chairman of KELA 1951–1961.

References 

1895 births
1971 deaths
People from Jyväskylä
People from Vaasa Province (Grand Duchy of Finland)
Leaders of the Social Democratic Party of Finland
Deputy Prime Ministers of Finland
Ministers of Finance of Finland
Ministers of Trade and Industry of Finland
Members of the Parliament of Finland (1930–33)
Members of the Parliament of Finland (1933–36)
Members of the Parliament of Finland (1936–39)
Members of the Parliament of Finland (1939–45)
Members of the Parliament of Finland (1945–48)
Members of the Parliament of Finland (1948–51)
Members of the Parliament of Finland (1951–54)
Members of the Parliament of Finland (1954–58)
Members of the Parliament of Finland (1958–62)
Finnish people of World War II